Serge Ruchet (born 11 February 1938) is a Swiss racing cyclist. He rode in the 1961 Tour de France.

References

1938 births
Living people
Swiss male cyclists
Place of birth missing (living people)